Tetrapodophis (greek meaning "four-footed snake") is an extinct genus of lizard from the Early Cretaceous. Tetrapodophis was previously thought to be one of the oldest members of Ophidia (Snakes and their extinct relatives). However, this classification has been disputed by Caldwell et al. (2016), Paparella et al. (2018) and Caldwell et al. (2021), who identify Tetrapodophis as a dolichosaurid (more closely related to the Ophidia than to mosasaurs, but lie in the greater clade, Ophidiomorpha). This species existed in the Cretaceous Period about 120 million years ago, located in modern day Brazil.

Description
 
Tetrapodophis possesses small yet well-developed fore- and Hindlimbs like a lizard and a long body similar to a snake. Nevertheless, it shares many characteristics with modern snakes, including an elongate body, short tail, broad belly scales, a skull with a short snout and long braincase, curved jaws, and sharp hooked teeth. BMMS BK 2-2 contains bones of another animal in its gut, indicating that Tetrapodophis was carnivorous like most snakes but it turns out to be a lizard. Other features such as short neural spines suggest that Tetrapodophis was adapted to burrowing, lending support to the hypothesis that snakes evolved in terrestrial environments (another hypothesis posits that they evolved in aquatic environments). The high number of vertebrae (upwards of 150) in Tetrapodophis and snakes is not seen in other burrowing reptiles with elongate bodies and reduced or absent limbs, meaning that it is most likely not an adaptation for a serpentine form of movement. Dolichosaurids are thought to be phylogenetically close to snakes as members of Ophidiomorpha, which explains some of the morphological similarities.

Discovery and controversy
The type species, Tetrapodophis amplectus, was named in 2015 on the basis of a complete skeleton (BMMS BK 2-2) preserved on a limestone slab in the Bürgermeister Müller Museum in Solnhofen, Germany, which was labeled as "unknown fossil" until its importance was recognized by paleontologist David Martill, and illegally exported from Brazil, since the country's laws do not allow the removal of fossils from its territory, nor that studies on them be conducted without the participation of at least one Brazilian scientist.  The specimen was later determined to come from the Early Cretaceous Crato Formation in Ceará, Brazil. When asked why he didn't have a Brazilian scientist in the describing team, as required by Brazilian law, Martill responded:

Martill stated in 2020 that his comments were poorly worded.

Classification
A phylogenetic analysis published alongside the original 2015 description of Tetrapodophis places it as a close relative of other lizards, but outside the crown group Serpentes, meaning that tetrapodophis branched off before the most recent common ancestor of all living snakes. Below is a cladogram from that analysis:

The interpretation of Tetrapodophis amplectus as an early fossorial snake was challenged by Caldwell et al. (2016), who considered it more likely to be a dolichosaurid squamate. A position corroborated by later analysis in 2018 and in 2021.

Related articles 
 Ophidia 
 Pythonomorpha, including dolichosaurs, snakes and mosasaurs
Coniophis
Paleontology
Najash rionegrina
Dinilysia patagonica

References

External links

 Tetrapodophis as it may have been in life
 Scientists Discover Four-Legged Snake Fossil. On: SciTechDaily, Source: University of Portsmouth. 2 August 2015
 Susan Evans: “Four legs too many?," In: Science  Vol. 349 no. 6246 pp. 374–375. 24 July 2015; doi:10.1126/science.aac5672

Cretaceous snakes
Transitional fossils
Early Cretaceous reptiles of South America
Cretaceous Brazil
Fossils of Brazil
Crato Formation
Fossil taxa described in 2015